The pufflegs are hummingbirds from the genera Eriocnemis and Haplophaedia. They occur in humid forest, woodland and shrub at altitudes of 1000 to 4800 m. asl in the Andes of Argentina, Bolivia, Peru, Ecuador, Colombia, and Venezuela. The males have a colorful green, coppery or blue plumage, and the females are generally somewhat duller. The most striking feature of both sexes is their dense snow-white leg puffs which consist of feather tufts that resemble woolly panties. One species - the black-thighed puffleg - is characterized by black coloured leg puffs, and another - the buff-thighed puffleg - has lightly buff-tinged leg puffs. Further common features of all species are the straight black bill and the slightly to deeply forked tail. The members of the genus Haplophaedia are generally duller than the members of Eriocnemis.

While most pufflegs remain fairly common, three species (colorful puffleg, black-breasted puffleg and gorgeted puffleg) are critically endangered and one (the turquoise-throated puffleg) is possibly extinct.

Puffleg species

 Genus Eriocnemis
 Black-breasted puffleg, Eriocnemis nigrivestis
 Gorgeted puffleg, Eriocnemis isabellae
 Glowing puffleg, Eriocnemis vestitus
 Black-thighed puffleg, Eriocnemis derbyi
 Turquoise-throated puffleg, Eriocnemis godini - possibly extinct (20th century?)
 Coppery-bellied puffleg, Eriocnemis cupreoventris
 Sapphire-vented puffleg, Eriocnemis luciani
 Coppery-naped puffleg, Eriocnemis (luciani) sapphiropygia
 Golden-breasted puffleg, Eriocnemis mosquera
 Blue-capped puffleg, Eriocnemis glaucopoides
 Colorful puffleg, Eriocnemis mirabilis
 Emerald-bellied puffleg, Eriocnemis aline
 Genus Haplophaedia
 Greenish puffleg, Haplophaedia aureliae
 Buff-thighed puffleg, Haplophaedia (aureliae) assimilis
 Hoary puffleg, Haplophaedia lugens

In addition there were the controversial species: Eriocnemis söderströmi, E. isaacsoni and E. dyselius which were each only known by one specimen. In the case of E. söderströmi it could have been either the female of E. godini or a hybrid between E. luciani and E. nigrivestris. E. dyselius was nothing more than a melanistic individual of E. cupreoventris. Today these species are considered invalid.

References
 Heynen, I. (1999). Eriocnemis and Haplophaedia (pufflegs). pp. 639–643 in: del Hoyo, J., Elliott, A., & Sargatal, J. eds. (1999). Handbook of the Birds of the World. Vol. 5. Barn-owls to Hummingbirds. Lynx Edicions, Barcelona. 
 Systematics and biogeography of the Andean genus Eriocnemis (Aves: Trochilidae) (Abstract)

^
Bird common names